The 22454 / 22453 Meerut City–Lucknow Rajya Rani Express is a Superfast Express train of the Rajya Rani Express series belonging to Indian Railways – North Central Railway zone that runs between  and Lucknow NE in India.

It operates as train number 22454 from Meerut to Lucknow NE and as train number 22453 in the reverse direction serving the state of Uttar Pradesh.

It is part of the Rajya Rani Express series launched by the former railway minister of India, Ms. Mamata Banerjee in the 2011/12 Rail Budget  .

Coaches

The 22454 / 53 Meerut City–Lucknow Rajya Rani Express has 2 AC Chair Car, 7 Second Class seating, 2 General Unreserved & 2 SLR (Seating cum Luggage Rake) coaches. It does not carry a pantry car.  

As is customary with most train services in India, coach composition may be amended at the discretion of Indian Railways depending on demand.

Rake sharing

The 22454 / 53 Meerut City–Lucknow Rajya Rani Express shares its rake with 11109 / 10 Jhansi–Lucknow Intercity Express.

Service

As the average speed of the train is above , as per Indian Railways rules, its fare includes a Superfast surcharge.

Routeing

Traction

As the route is now fully doubled and electrified, a Kanpur / Jhansi-based WAP-4 hauls the train for its entire journey.

Operation

22454 Meerut City–Lucknow Rajya Rani Express runs from Meerut City on a daily basis arriving at Lucknow NE the same day..
22453 Lucknow–Meerut City Rajya Rani Express runs from Lucknow NE on a daily basis arriving in Meerut the same day.

Accidents

2017 
Eight coaches of the Meerut–Lucknow Rajya Rani Express derailed at 8:15 AM on 15 April 2017, between Rampur and Mundapanda near a bridge over the Koshi river. A total of 13 passengers were injured. Three of the derailed coaches overturned while seven went off the tracks. Railway Minister Suresh Prabhu ordered an inquiry into the cause of accident. He also announced a compensation of 50,000 for the passengers injured in the derailment. A compensation of 50,000 and 25,000 for passengers with serious and minor injuries respectively was announced by UP Chief Minister Yogi Adityanath.

References

External links

http://adknack.in/tender/wp-content/uploads/2012/03/IMPORTANT_NOTICE_ENGLISH_10_X_8.pdf
http://www.90di.com/schedule/train/Indian%20Railways_22454.html
https://www.youtube.com/watch?v=pluwvlFfDek
http://www.bhaskar.com/news/UP-rajya-rani-express-from-meerut-to-lucknow-2964225.html
http://media2.intoday.in/businesstoday/images/RailBudget_2011-12.pdf
http://timesofindia.indiatimes.com/city/lucknow/Shatabdi-Exp-on-Lucknow-Junction-from-April-29/articleshow/32327591.cms

Transport in Meerut
Passenger trains originating from Lucknow
Rajya Rani Express trains